The 1996 Speedway Grand Prix was the 51st edition of the official World Championship to determine the world champion rider. It was the second season in the Speedway Grand Prix era and was used to determine the Speedway World Champion. 

The world title was won by Billy Hamill; it was his first and only World Champion title. Defending champion Hans Nielsen was set to win his fifth world crown with a nine point lead going into the last of the six events at Vojens. However Hamill won the event gaining 25 points and Nielsen only managed 14 points leaving the Dane two points behind the American in the final standings.

Event format 
During 1996 the initial SGP scoring system used in 1995 remained in place. Each rider raced every other in the meeting with the top 4 qualifying for a final - the points for all other riders determined their finishing position in the meeting and therefore their championship Grand Prix points. The 4 finalists scored 25, 20, 18 and 16 points, with the reminder scoring 14, 13, 12, 11, 9, 8, 7, 6, 4, 3, 2, 1.

Qualification for Grand Prix 

The 1996 season had 17 permanent riders and one wild card at each event.  The permanent riders are highlighted in the results table below.

Calendar

Final standings

See also 
 motorcycle speedway

References

External links 
 Official Speedway GP site

 
1996
World I